Gaignun ("watch-dog") is the warhorse of Marsile, Saracen king of Spain in the French epic, The Song of Roland. Gaignun is mentioned in laisse 142 of the poem.

References

Matter of France
Individual warhorses
Fictional horses